The Lottery Office is an Australian online lottery operator licensed by the Government of the Northern Territory and allows Australians and New Zealanders to play to win from the draws of the largest lotteries in the world, including US Powerball and Mega Millions. Its parent company, Global Players Network Pty Ltd (GPN), has been licensed and regulated to operate lotteries since 2003.

Overview
The Lottery Office is licensed in Australia and allows players to win from the draws of foreign lotteries.

The Lottery Office allows players to buy tickets from The Lottery Office; the company then purchases matching tickets in the relevant overseas lottery draw. Combos, Syndicates and matching tickets can be played in the following international lotteries:

 USA Power Lotto (US Powerball)
 USA Mega Lotto (US Mega Millions)
 European Millions (EuroMillions)
 European Jackpot (Eurojackpot)
 Italian Super Jackpot (SuperEnalotto)
 La Primitiva (El Gordo de la Primitiva)
 Irish Lotto (Irish National Lottery)
 UK Lotto (UK National Lottery)

In July 2021, a Sydney restaurateur won a record breaking $1.656 million AUD in USA Power Lotto.

Regulation 
In 2014, the Government of the Northern Territory of Australia issued Global Players Network an Internet Gaming Licence, which is licensed in Australia to market international lottery products online. Being the parent company, The Lottery Office is licensed via Global Players Network.

To meet all regulatory requirements set out by the Northern Territory Government, lottery companies regularly undertake financial and operational audits. The Lottery Office additionally receives ongoing and contemporaneous auditing of customer orders against matching tickets purchased, from the Northern Territory Government. Requirements include responsible gambling measures for the safety of all players, enforcement of Australia's gambling age, and features such as weekly deposit limits, self-exclusion and take a break functions.

In June 2018, the Australian Federal Government passed legislation to ban 'lottery betting' under the revised Interactive Gambling Act. It was intended to make it illegal for Australians to bet on the outcome of foreign lotteries, but a case before the Supreme Court of New South Wales ruled that such bets were legal on the basis that the players were betting on an event occurring rather than betting on a game. However, as The Lottery Office does not participate in lottery betting, as it does not allow players to bet on the outcome of a draw, it was not prohibited by the law.

See also

Lotteries in Australia

References

External links
 Official website

Australian companies established in 2003
Gambling companies established in 2003
Gambling companies of Australia
Companies based in Darwin, Northern Territory
Companies based on the Gold Coast, Queensland
Lotteries in Australia